Kubat is a surname.

Those bearing it include:
 Bohumil Kubát (1935–2016) Czechoslovakian wrestler
 Michaela Kubat (born 1969), German footballer
 Kubat (singer) (born 1974), Turkish singer
 Çağla Kubat (born 1979), Turkish model & actress 
Enes Kubat, Turkish footballer
 Mike Kubat, Canadian television writer

Other uses
 Kubat Pasha Madrasa, a historic building in Tarsus district of Mersin Province, Turkey

Turkish-language surnames